Breach Candy Hospital is a private hospital located in Mumbai, India. It is located in the Breach Candy area of South Mumbai.  It is well known for the rich and famous patients that have been in the hospital.

History 

It was established in 1950 at the upmarket Breach Candy area in South Mumbai, and designed by an English architect Claude Batley.

It started functioning as a 25-bed nursing home. Today, BCH is a multi-specialty hospital with over 220 beds.

The hospital's specialists include some of the most distinguished names in the Indian medical profession.

Before 2005, the Pirojsha Godrej Foundation funded a wing of the hospital known as the Pirojsha Godrej Wing.

Services 

Breach Candy Hospital is managed by the Breach Candy Hospital Trust.  It provides the following services:

 Anesthesiology
 Bariatric services
 Blood bank
 Cardiology and thoracic surgery
 Dermatology
 Endocrinology
 Ear, nose and throat
 General surgery
 Gynecology
 Hematology
 Neurology
 Oncology
 Opthomalogy
 Pediatric surgery
 Plastic surgery
 Psychiatry
 Radiology
 Rheumatology
 Sleep laboratory
 Urology
 Vascular surgery

BCH is a leader in interventional cardiology.

Notable patients
The following notable and famous persons were patients at Breach Candy hospital:

 Former Prime Minister of India, Atal Bihari Vajpayee underwent a knee surgery at the hospital in 2000, when he was in office.
 Dhirubhai Ambani, who was admitted to the hospital, breathed his last on 6 July 2002 after a major stroke.
 Vilasrao Deshmukh, a former Chief Minister of Maharashtra, was admitted to the hospital in the first week of August 2012. He was diagnosed with both liver and kidney failure. He was later taken to Global Hospital in Chennai, where he died on 14 August 2012.
 Socialite and philanthropist Parmeshwar Godrej died on 11 October 2016 due to a lung ailment at the hospital.
 Legendary Singer Lata Mangeshkar died on 6 February 2022, after a long battle with COVID-19 and pneumonia. She was admitted on 8 January 2022.
 Indian cricketer Virat Kohli and actress Anushka Sharma's daughter Vamika Kohli was born on 11 January 2021.
 Actress Sara Ali Khan was born on August 12, 1995.
 Indian actor Akshay Kumar and former actress Twinkle Khanna's daughter Nitara was born on 25 September 2012 
 Indian actor Ajay Devgn and actress Kajol's daughter Nysa was born on April 20, 2003. 
 Indian billionaire and business magnate, stock trader and investor Rakesh Jhunjhunwala died on August 14, 2022.

References 

Hospital buildings completed in 1950
Hospitals in Mumbai
Private hospitals in India
1950 establishments in Bombay State
20th-century architecture in India